Loganville is an unincorporated community in Sierra County, California, United States.

References

Unincorporated communities in California
Unincorporated communities in Sierra County, California